Fredrik Olofsson (born 27 May 1996) is a Swedish professional ice hockey forward currently playing with the  Dallas Stars of the National Hockey League (NHL). He was selected by Chicago Blackhawks in the fourth-round, 98th overall, of the 2014 NHL Entry Draft.

Playing career
Olofsson was born in Sweden and raised in Broomfield, Colorado. He played for the Colorado Thunderbirds from 2009 to 2013. He then played for the Green Bay Gamblers of the United States Hockey League (USHL) during the 2012–13 season, where he appeared in eight games. He began the 2013–14 season with the Gamblers, recording two goals and four assists in 28 games. He was then traded to the Chicago Steel, where he finished the season with four goals and 11 assists in 24 games for the Steel. During the 2014–15 season, he recorded 27 goals and 33 assists in 57 games.

Olofsson was originally committed to play college ice hockey for Colorado College, along with his brother Gustav Olofsson. However, on 1 December 2014, he signed with the University of Nebraska Omaha. He played for the Mavericks from 2015 to 2019, where he recorded 35 goals and 60 assists in 137 games. On 6 September 2018, he was named as an assistant captain for his senior year, where he led the team in assists with 24. Following his collegiate career, he signed an amateur tryout contract with the Chicago Blackhawks' AHL affiliate the Rockford IceHogs on 21 March 2019. He appeared in two games for the IceHogs.

On 14 May 2019, he signed a one-year contract with Modo Hockey of the HockeyAllsvenskan. During the 2019–20 season, he recorded ten goals and 24 assists in 52 games. On 3 April 2020, he signed with IK Oskarshamn of the SHL. During the 2020–21 season, he recorded 13 goals and 21 assists in 15 games.

Following two seasons in the SHL with IK Oskarshamn, Olofsson returned to North America as a free agent and secured a one-year, $750,000 NHL contract with the Dallas Stars on 19 May 2022.

International play
On 1 January 2022, Olofsson was named to Sweden men's national ice hockey team to compete at the 2022 Winter Olympics.

Personal life
Fredrik's older brother, Gustav, is a professional ice hockey player.

Career statistics

Regular season and playoffs

International

References

External links
 

1996 births
Living people
Chicago Blackhawks draft picks
Chicago Steel players
Dallas Stars players
Green Bay Gamblers players
IK Oskarshamn players
Modo Hockey players
Ice hockey players at the 2022 Winter Olympics
Olympic ice hockey players of Sweden
Omaha Mavericks men's ice hockey players
Rockford IceHogs (AHL) players
Swedish expatriate ice hockey players in the United States
Swedish ice hockey forwards
Sportspeople from Helsingborg
Texas Stars players